Abu Hazim may refer to:

 An alternate name for Abdel Aziz al-Muqrin, a leader of AQAP
 Abu Hazim al-Libi, tortured by the CIA in its black site network